The 1962 Gator Bowl was a post-season college football bowl game between the Penn State Nittany Lions an independent and the Gators of the University of Florida representing the SEC. Florida upset Penn State, 17–7. To inspire the underdog Gators against a northern foe, the Confederate Battle Flag was worn on their helmets.

Game summary
Quarterback Tom Shannon was the MVP for Florida, while defensive tackle Dave Robinson was the MVP for Penn State.

References

Gator Bowl
Gator Bowl
Penn State Nittany Lions football bowl games
Florida Gators football bowl games
20th century in Jacksonville, Florida
1962 in sports in Florida
December 1962 sports events in the United States